An RG color model is a dichromatic color model represented by red and green primary colors. The name of the pair of models comes from the initials of the two primary colors: red and green. The model may be either additive or subtractive. The primaries are added together in varying proportions to reproduce a linear gamut of colors, which can reproduce only a fraction of the colors possible with a trichromatic color space, such as for human color vision.

The appearance of the color gamut changes depending on the primary colors chosen. When the primaries are complementary colors (e.g. red and cyan), then an equal mixture of the primaries will yield a neutral color (gray or white). However, when the primaries are not complementary colors, an equal mixture of the primaries will yield yellow, and a neutral color cannot be reproduced by the color space.

Despite its shortcomings in color reproduction, these models were used in early color processes for films.

Additive RG
The additive RG color model uses red and green primary lights. In modern applications, the red and green primaries are equal to the primaries used in typical RGB color spaces, so are not complementary. In this case, the RG color model can be achieved by disabling the blue light source. The additive RG color model was used in several processes during the early innovations of color photography, including Kinemacolor, Prizma, Technicolor I, and Raycol.

Until recently, its primary use was in low-cost LED displays in which red and green LEDs were more common and cheaper than the still nascent blue LED technology. However, this preference no longer applies to modern devices.

Subtractive RG
The subtractive RG color model uses red and green primary pigments. This color model cannot achieve black, regardless of the primaries chosen. A similar color model, called RGK adds a black channel, which allows for the reproduction of black and other dark shades. However, it does not allow the reproduction of neutral colors (gray/white) if the primaries are not complementary.

The subtractive RG color model was used in several processes during the early innovations of color photography, including on Brewster Color I, Kodachrome I, Prizma II, and Technicolor II.

Outside of a few low-cost high-volume applications, such as packaging and labelling, RG and RGK are no longer in use because devices providing larger gamuts such as CMYK are in widespread use.

Anaglyph 3D

In 1858, in France,  delivered a report to l'Académie des sciences describing how to project three-dimensional magic lantern slide shows using red and green filters to an audience wearing red and green goggles. Subsequently he was chronicled as being responsible for the first realisation of 3D images using anaglyphs.

ColorCode 3-D, a anaglyph stereoscopic color scheme, uses the RG color space to simulate a broad spectrum of color in one eye, while the blue portion of the spectrum transmits a black-and-white (black-and-blue) image to the other eye to give depth perception.

See also

 List of monochrome and RGB color formats
 List of motion picture film formats
 List of color film systems
 rg chromaticity
 Anaglyphic color channels

References

External links
Even Proportional Color Triangle
Cinematographic Multiplex Projection, &c. U.S. Patent No. 1,391,029, filed Feb. 20, 1917.
"Moving Pictures in Color", The New York Times, February 22, 1917, p. 9.
The First Successful Color Movie", Popular Science, Feb. 1923, p. 59.
filmmakeriq.com, The History and Science of Color Film: From Isaac Newton to the Coen Brothers

Color space